Degumuiža is a village in Krimūna Parish and Dobele Municipality in the historical region of Zemgale, and the Zemgale Planning Region in Latvia.

Dobele Municipality
Towns and villages in Latvia